Deogaon is a small village on the banks of Kusei River in the Kendujhar District of Orissa, India. It lies at a distance of 10 km from Anandapur, 90 km from the district headquarters Kendujhar and 170 km from Bhubaneswar, the state capital.

It is a village within the Ghasipura Block of Anandapur Subdivision. The people of the village are Hindus. Most of the people are farmers, a few work in Government and Private sectors. The majority of youths in the village are engaged in various types of businesses.

The neighbourhood villages are Bangarakota, Tarimul, Kesadurapal among others.

Places of interest
The village is located on the banks of the Kusei River. It has a unique place in the culture of the Kendujhar district. In the past it was a flourishing seat of Buddhism.

Kushaleshwar Temple
The temple of Kushaleswar built in 900 CE is a famous centre of pilgrimage. It is one of the holiest shrine of Lord Shiva in the district. On the occasion of Maha Shivaratri a large fair is organized at this place that lasts for more than half a month. Devotees from all over the state come to worship in the temple.

Pathara Bandha
It is one of the most important monuments of the place. It is a stone embankment on the river Kusei which is the second of its kind in the state; the first being the embankment on the river Kathajodi at Cuttack.

References

External links
http://kendujhar.nic.in

Villages in Kendujhar district